Fighting Coast Guard is a 1951 American adventure film directed by Joseph Kane and written by Kenneth Gamet. The film stars Brian Donlevy, Forrest Tucker, Ella Raines, John Russell, Richard Jaeckel, William Murphy and Martin Milner. The film was released on June 1, 1951, by Republic Pictures.

Plot
Shortly before the attack on Pearl Harbor, shipyard foreman Bill Rourk is feuding with a former football star, Barney Walker, who now works there. He is romantically attracted to Louise Ryan, an admiral's daughter working as a wartime welder, but she is dating Ian McFarland, a naval commander.

McFarland launches an officers training course once America becomes active in World War II. Bill signs up, but his record is tainted by lies told by Walker. He is also caught out after curfew by the military police, while trying to romance Louise.

Walker is fatally injured in battle and confesses his lies about Bill before dying. When a former shipyard colleague, young Tony Jessup, is stranded and endangered, Bill disobeys orders and heroically tries to save Tony, who dies while being rescued. McFarland commends his bravery, then confides to that his sweetheart, Louise, has fallen in love with Bill.

Cast    
Brian Donlevy as Commander McFarland
Forrest Tucker as Bill Rourk
Ella Raines as Louise Ryan
John Russell as Barney Walker
Richard Jaeckel as Tony Jessup
William Murphy as Sandy Jessup
Martin Milner as Al Prescott
Steve Brodie as 'Red' Toon
Hugh O'Brian as Tom Peterson
Tom Powers as Admiral Ryan
Jack Pennick as Coast Guardsman
Olin Howland as Desk Clerk 
Damian O'Flynn as Captain Adair 
Morris Ankrum as Navy Captain
James Flavin as Commander Rogers
Roy Roberts as Captain Gibbs
Sandra Spence as Muriel
Eric Pedersen as Civilian Wrestler
Sons of the Pioneers as Musicians

Reception
Bosley Crowther, critic for The New York Times, wrote, "Directed and played in a florid fashion, this story falls flatly in the class of low-grade adventure fiction that makes neither point nor sense."

References

External links
 

1951 films
American adventure films
1951 adventure films
Republic Pictures films
Films about the United States Coast Guard
Films directed by Joseph Kane
Films scored by David Buttolph
American World War II films
American black-and-white films
1950s English-language films
1950s American films